The 2019 TCR Malaysia Touring Car Championship was the first season of the TCR Malaysia Touring Car Championship. The season began on 19 January at the Sepang International Circuit and ended on 24 February at the same circuit.

Teams and drivers
Yokohama is the official tire supplier.

Calendar and results
The calendar was released on 10 October 2018, with all rounds being held within Malaysia.

Championship standings

Drivers' championship

† — In the first race of the second round, half points after a stopped race.

Team's Standings

References 

TCR Malaysia Touring Car Championship
Malaysia Touring Car Championship